Gordon Raymond Morritt (8 February 1942 – November 2018) was an English footballer who made 265 appearances in the Football League playing as a goalkeeper for Rotherham United, Doncaster Rovers, Northampton Town, York City, Rochdale and Darlington in the 1960s and 1970s. He also played in South Africa for Durban City. He played in some of Rotherham's matches as they reached the first ever League Cup Final in 1961, but Roy Ironside was preferred for the final itself, in which Rotherham lost 3–0 on aggregate to Aston Villa.

Morritt was born in Rotherham in 1942, and died in November 2018 at the age of 76.

References

1942 births
2018 deaths
Footballers from Rotherham
English footballers
Association football goalkeepers
Phoenix F.C. players
Rotherham United F.C. players
Durban City F.C. players
Doncaster Rovers F.C. players
Northampton Town F.C. players
York City F.C. players
Rochdale A.F.C. players
Darlington F.C. players
English Football League players